The flag of Vietnam, formally the National Flag of the Socialist Republic of Vietnam, locally recognized as  and also , was designed in 1940 and used during an uprising against the French in southern Vietnam that year. The red background symbolizes revolution and bloodshed. The golden star represents the five main classes in Vietnamese society — intellectuals, farmers, workers, entrepreneurs, and soldiers. 

The flag was used by the Viet Minh, a communist-led organization created in 1941 to oppose Japanese occupation. At the end of World War II, Viet Minh leader Ho Chi Minh proclaimed Vietnam independent and signed a decree on 5 September 1945 adopting the Viet Minh flag as the flag of the Democratic Republic of Vietnam. The DRV became the government of North Vietnam in 1954 following the Geneva Accords. The flag was modified on 30 November 1955 to make the rays of the star pointier.  Until the end of the Vietnam War in 1975, South Vietnam used a yellow flag with three red stripes. The red flag of North Vietnam was later adopted as the flag of the unified Vietnam in 1976. The flag of Vietnam is the only flag amongst ASEAN that does not contain the colour white, with red and yellow/gold being its historical national colours.

Design and history
Vietnamese flag colours have often been various designs of red and bright yellow. According to the 1992 constitution: "The National Flag of the Socialist Republic of Vietnam is rectangular in shape, its width is equal to two thirds of its length, in the middle of fresh red background is a bright five-pointed golden star". The flag is blazoned: Gules, a mullet of five points or.

The flag first appeared in the Southern uprising (Nam Kỳ Khởi nghĩa) of 23 November 1940, against French rule in southern Vietnam. A series of articles by Sơn Tùng on the origin of the flag were published in the state media in 1981. Sơn Tùng stated that the flag was designed by Nguyễn Hữu Tiến, a leader of the uprising who was arrested by the French in advance of the failed uprising and executed 28 August 1941. Tiến, who was born in the northern village of Lũng Xuyên, was unknown to the Vietnamese public before Tùng's research was published. According to a poem Tiến wrote, the red background came to represent the blood of the people, whilst  the yellow foreground came to represent "the colour of our people’s skin" which was written during times of oppression from Japanese rule. The five points of the star represents intellectuals, peasants, workers, traders and soldiers.

Yellow and red has long been common amongst Vietnamese flags. Yellow/Gold was a traditional color of Vietnam for more than 2,000 years. In April 2001, Vietnam's Ministry of Culture reported that there was no documentation to support the claim that Tiến designed the flag. In 2005, Lê Minh Đức, an official of Tiền Giang province, suggested that the flag was designed by another cadre, Lê Quang Sô, a native of Mỹ Tho Province in the Mekong delta. Đức's theory is based on statements by Sô's son as well as Sô's 1968 memoir. According to Đức, yellow was chosen to represent Vietnam while the red background was inspired by the flag of the Communist Party and represents revolution. Sô experimented with stars in various positions and sizes before choosing a large star in the center for aesthetic reasons. In April 1940, the flag was approved by Phan Văn Khỏe, the Communist party chief of Mỹ Tho. It was subsequently approved by the national party in July. As of 2006, the state media has not commented on Đức's version of events.

The flag was displayed at a conference on 19 May 1941, at which the Viet Minh was founded. The Viet Minh proclaimed it a "national flag" on 17 August 1945, at a meeting held in the village of Tân Trào in the North. When the Japanese surrendered at the end of World War II, the Viet Minh entered Hanoi and proclaimed the "Democratic Republic of Vietnam" on 2 September. On 5 September, DRV President Ho Chi Minh signed a decree adopting the Vietminh flag. French troops returned in October and restored colonial rule in the South. The National Assembly voted unanimously to adopt the flag on 2 March 1946. Following the Geneva Accord between Viet Minh and France in 1954, the DRV became the government of North Vietnam.

On 30 November 1955, the flag's design was modified slightly to make the star smaller and its rays straighter. This followed a similar modification of the flag of the Soviet Union. The flag was adopted in the South after the end of the Vietnam war, and North and South were unified as the Socialist Republic of Vietnam on 2 July 1976. The flag of the Democratic Republic of Vietnam (the Viet Minh-controlled areas in Northern and Southern Vietnam and later just North Vietnam) from 1945 to 1955 was similar to the current flag of Vietnam but with the points of the star set at a more obtuse angle.

Despite its historical connotations, nowadays, the red background (or red field) on the Vietnamese flag is commonly a symbol of bloodshed, struggle, and the success of revolution, inspired by communist symbolism. The yellow star centred on the red field symbolizes one of five classes of society —entrepreneurs, farmers, workers, intellectuals and soldiers representing each point of the star. The flag may also be flown with the flag of the Communist Party of Vietnam.

Colour scheme & design
This is a color approximation of the Vietnamese flag. The Vietnamese lawmakers never nominate the standardized color schemes, and flags with different color shades are physically and digitally displayed by both civilians and state media as long as they obey the "red background with a centered yellow star" symbolism.

Historical flags 

Traditional images show the Trung sisters wearing yellow turbans during their revolt against North (China) in AD 40. These were unwrapped and waved to signal the beginning of a fight. A yellow banner with a red circle in the center was adopted as a standard by Emperor Gia Long (r. 1802–1820). The French, who gradually gained control of Vietnam in the late 19th century, flew the national flag of France. The colony of Cochinchina (1862–1945) was under exclusive French authority. In contrast, Annam and Tonkin were protectorates with parallel systems of Vietnamese and French administration.

Japan occupied Vietnam in 1941–1945. In March 1945, the Japanese deposed the French colonial authorities and proclaimed an Empire of Vietnam with Bảo Đại as emperor. The , a red quẻ Ly (one of eight trigrams used in the I Ching) on a yellow background, was adopted in June. Among other things, quẻ Ly ☲ symbolizes the direction south. Bảo Đại abdicated in August when Japan surrendered. The Democratic Republic of Vietnam, proclaimed on 2 September 1945, adopted the red flag with a golden star. The French returned in 23rd of the same month, but were challenged by the Vietminh, especially in the North. The French proclaimed Cochinchina an autonomous republic in June 1946. This puppet state adopted a flag with three blue stripes on a yellow background.

In 1947, the name of the Cochinchina government was changed to "Provisional Government of Southern Vietnam" in preparation for a merger with the Provisional Central Government of Vietnam outlined in the Hạ Long Bay agreements between France and Bảo Đại. The flag of the State of Vietnam was adopted by Emperor Bảo Đại in 1948. The three stripes represented the Quẻ Càn, or Qian trigram. Quẻ Càn is the divination sign for heaven. On 2 June 1948, Prime Minister of the Provisional Central Government Nguyễn Văn Xuân, signed an ordinance to adopt this flag: "The national emblem is a flag of yellow background, the height of which is equal to two-thirds of its width. In the middle of the flag and along its entire width, there are three horizontal red bands. Each band has a height equal to one-fifteenth of the width. These three red bands are separated from one another by a space of the band's height." The flag of the State of Vietnam was later also used by its successor the Republic of Vietnam, commonly known as South Vietnam.

On 8 June 1969, the National Liberation Front of South Vietnam (Viet Cong) adopted a tricolor flag modelled from that of North Vietnam, which is the red half at the top, the blue half at the bottom, and a yellow star in the center. This replaced the yellow flag after the fall of Saigon, and was used until the reunification with North Vietnam on 2 July 1976.

On the other hand, in January 2017, San Jose, which has the largest population of Vietnamese emigrants from what was formerly South Vietnam in the United States, banned the Vietnamese flag from being displayed on city flagpoles. This was motivated by a 2016 policy adopted by Westminster, California forbidding the display of the flag on city property. Nearby Milpitas also banned the flag from municipal display on 5 September 2017.

Historical & foreign-involved flags

Gallery

Notes

See also 

 List of flags of Vietnam
 Flag of South Vietnam
 List of flags of the Republic of Vietnam Military Forces

References

External links 

National symbols of Vietnam
 
Vietnam
Vietnam
Vietnam